Srobotnik pri Velikih Laščah is a small village southeast of Velike Lašče in central Slovenia. The entire Municipality of Velike Lašče is part of the traditional region of Lower Carniola and is now included in the Central Slovenia Statistical Region.

Name
The name of the settlement was changed from Srobotnik to Srobotnik pri Velikih Laščah in 1953.

Church
The local church, built on a small hill northwest of the main settlement, is dedicated to Saint Roch and belongs to the Parish of Velike Lašče. It was commissioned in 1624 by the owner of Ortnek Castle Krištof Moškon (Count Mosconi). It was rebuilt in 1731 and again in 1875. During the Second World War, it was targeted by Partisan mortars on 28 February 1944. During the attack, the main altar was burned, together with a painting by Anton Postl from 1770. The church was restored in the 1970s.

References

External links
Srobotnik pri Velikih Laščah on Geopedia

Populated places in the Municipality of Velike Lašče